Gravesham Borough Council is the local authority for Gravesham in Kent, England. The council is elected every four years. Since the last boundary changes in 2003, 44 councillors have been elected from 18 wards.

Political control
The first election to the council was held in 1973, initially operating as a shadow authority before coming into its powers on 1 April 1974. Political control of the council since 1973 has been held by the following parties:

Leadership
The leaders of the council since 1996 have been:

Council elections
1973 Gravesham Borough Council election
1976 Gravesham Borough Council election
1979 Gravesham Borough Council election (New ward boundaries)
1983 Gravesham Borough Council election
1987 Gravesham Borough Council election (Borough boundary changes took place but the number of seats remained the same)
1991 Gravesham Borough Council election
1995 Gravesham Borough Council election
1999 Gravesham Borough Council election
2003 Gravesham Borough Council election (New ward boundaries)
2007 Gravesham Borough Council election
2011 Gravesham Borough Council election
2015 Gravesham Borough Council election
2019 Gravesham Borough Council election

Borough result maps

By-election results

1995-1999

2003-2007

2007-2011

2011-2015

2015-2019

2019-2023

References

By-election results

External links
Gravesham Council

 
Gravesham
Council elections in Kent
District council elections in England